Mick Miller (16 January 1937 – 5 April 1998) was a notable Aboriginal Australian activist, politician, and statesman who campaigned for most of his life seeking greater social justice, land rights, and improved life opportunities for Aboriginal Australians in North Queensland and the rest of Australia.

Biographical details 
Mick Miller was born on Palm Island, Queensland on 16 January 1937, son of Michael Miller Senior (Waanyi) and Cissie Miller (née Sibley) (Kuku Yalanji), and eldest of seven children (5 girls, 2 boys).

By the early 1960s Miller had married Pat O'Shane in Cairns, and together they had two daughters, Lydia and Marilyn. Later he married Barbara Russell, and had a son, Michael.

Miller died from a heart seizure on 5 April 1998. It was reported that his funeral was attended by over a thousand people.

Education 
Miller received his primary school education at St Michael's Catholic School at Palm Island.  He completed his secondary schooling at Mt Carmel Boarding College at Charters Towers, Queensland.

By 1959 Miller had graduated from Kelvin Grove Teachers College in Brisbane, where he was one of the first Aboriginal Australians in Queensland to become a fully qualified teacher.

In the mid 1960s he obtained some early political training and encouragement by joining the local Aboriginal Advancement League and later the Federal Council for the Advancement of Aborigines and Torres Strait Islanders (FCAATSI), during which time he attended a World Council of Indigenous Peoples meeting at Kiruna in Samiland (Sweden).  .

Career
After qualifying as a teacher in 1959,   Miller was posted to Cairns, Queensland to teach at the North Cairns State Primary School. Some years later he resigned from this position, having encountered some resistance and difficulties within the Department of Education regarding his political activities and attendance at a World Council of Indigenous Peoples in Samiland (Sweden).

Having left teaching, Miller instead became an active member of the local branch of the Aboriginal Advancement League, and, by 1971-1972 had become vice-president of a Federal Council for the Advancement of Aboriginal and Torres Strait Islanders.  He also helped establish the original, politically active and influential North Queensland Land Council, of which he was chair for some time.

Miller also sat as a Board Member of the Aboriginal Arts Board, and by the 1980s had become a Commissioner with the Aboriginal Development Commission (ADC) and, later, Deputy Chair of the ADC, from where he sought to promote economic development as the key to getting Aboriginal people off welfare and government dependence.

In 1985, the Commonwealth Government appointed Miller to head up a federal government review of employment, education and training, ultimately producing what came to be known as the "Miller Report":  a significant Commonwealth Aboriginal and Torres Strait Islander training and employment policy document that was to become an Aboriginal employment and training  'blueprint' with 'pivotal impact on Government program policies for some time to come.

During the 1990s Miller chaired the State Tripartite Forum (a Queensland State Government-sponsored Aboriginal health organization) and in this way he became involved in many founding State policies and programs to improve the health of the Aboriginal people in Queensland.

Political dissident
By the early 1970s Miller, along with other local Aboriginal Australians in the Cairns region (including ex-boxing champion and close friend Clarry Grogan), had become active members of a local predominantly Aboriginal branch of the Aboriginal Advancement League; had become effective advocates on the Federal Council for the Advancement of Aborigines and Torres Strait Islanders (FCAATSI); were involved in founding an Aboriginal Legal Service to bring legal assistance to Aboriginal peoples in the North Queensland region; and, with the formation of the North Queensland Land Council in January 1976 were campaigning for Aboriginal land rights.

It was during this period that, following national success in a 1967 referendum winning Aboriginal Australians the right to be included on Australian electoral rolls,  Miller plus Clarry Grogan chose in 1977 to accompany Fred Hollows and his National Trachoma and Eye Health Program team on visits to North Queensland Aboriginal and Torres Strait Islander (ATSI) reserves .

While visiting Aboriginal and Torres Strait Islander communities, Miller and Grogan assisted people to sign onto electoral rolls, so confirming their reputation with the Queensland Government, and Premier Joh Bjelke-Petersen for being trouble-makers and political dissenters:

In 1998 Queensland's Land Rights newspaper summarized and described Mick Miller and his life's contribution as follows:

Couldn't Be Fairer

In 1984 Miller wrote and narrated a film named Couldn't Be Fairer (the expressed point of view of the then Premier of Queensland) about that state's treatment of Aboriginal peoples.  The film was produced in collaboration with filmmaker Dennis O'Rourke to bring attention to the social injustices that were endured by Aboriginal people.  The film included television footage and clips of politicians and businessmen openly expressing racist views (including Western Australian mining magnate, Lang Hancock suggesting mass sterilization; a town mayor calling Aboriginal people "savages", and a Queensland Graziers Association spokesperson dividing people into "true Aborigines" and "hybrids".)

See also
 Couldn't Be Fairer

References

External links
 Dennis O'Rourke & Mick Miller's "Couldn't Be Fairer" Camerwork webpage (includes photo of 1980s Mick Miller)Accessed 8 June 2010
 'Culture warriors' exhibition, National Gallery of Australia Accessed 4 June 2010
 Martin Ferguson (7 April 1998) House of Representatives 'Aboriginal Rights' speech. Hansard Accessed 7 June 2010
 Victorian Department of Education and Early Childhood Development's Couldn't Be Fairer video clip download pageAccessed 8 June 2010< 
 David Alias (5 September 1980) "Blacks List Top Target: Bauxite Mines will face ban" The Age8 June 2010

Australian indigenous rights activists
1937 births
1998 deaths
People from Queensland